Pelléas and Mélisande is a Symbolist play by the Belgian playwright and author Maurice Maeterlinck about the forbidden, doomed love of the title characters. It was first performed in 1893.

The work never achieved great success on the stage, apart from in the operatic setting by Claude Debussy, but it was at the time widely read and admired by the literary elite in the symbolist movement, such as Strindberg and Rilke. It also inspired other contemporary composers, including Gabriel Fauré, Arnold Schoenberg, Jean Sibelius, and Mel Bonis.

Synopsis
Golaud finds Mélisande by a stream in the woods. She has lost her crown in the water but does not wish to retrieve it. They marry, and she instantly wins the favor of Arkël, Golaud's grandfather and king of Allemonde, who is ill. She begins to be drawn to Pelléas, Golaud's brother. They meet by the fountain, where Mélisande loses her wedding ring. Golaud grows suspicious of the lovers, has his son Yniold spy on them, and discovers them caressing, whereupon he kills Pelléas and wounds Mélisande. She later dies after giving birth to an abnormally small girl.

Themes

This play treats the familiar triangle of wife, husband and lover, ending with the death of both the wife and the lover at the hands of the husband. The best known example of this triangle is the story of Paolo and Francesca of Rimini, treated in two highly successful plays also dating to the 1890s by Gabriele D'Annunzio and the English playwright Stephen Phillips.

A brief summary of the play will concentrate best on Mélisande. At the beginning of the play she has just escaped from a failed marriage that has so traumatized her that she scarcely remembers either it or her past. She marries Golaud through no choice of her own, and remains essentially distant from him. The audience realize she is falling in love with Pelléas long before she does. On her deathbed she has quite forgotten her final meeting with Pelléas and his death, and dies without realizing that she is dying. This and the whole play -- for none of the other characters are wiser -- expresses a sense that human beings understand neither themselves nor each other nor the world. The problem is not simply human blindness, but the lack of a fixed and definable reality to be known. This is the Maeterlinck who paved the way for the plays of Samuel Beckett. It is extraordinary that he achieves this within a story whose basic plot -- that of a woman, a husband and a lover and the tragedy that results -- is itself so conventional.

A key element in the play is the setting, whether visible in the stage scenery or described in the dialogue. The action takes place in an ancient, decaying castle, surrounded by deep forest, which only occasionally lets sunlight in, and with caverns underneath it that breathe infected air and are in danger of collapse. As numerous critics have pointed out, all this symbolizes the dominating power throughout the action of a destiny (the power of death, if you like) fatal to mankind. 

Note also the role of water, which appears in several forms throughout the work: Golaud finds her by a stream, Mélisande arrived in the kingdom by sea, she loses her wedding ring in a fountain, Golaud and Pelléas discover foul-smelling waters under Arkël's castle, Mélisande is often seen crying and mentions her tears several times. Moreover, most of the characters' names contain liquid consonants: Pelléas, Mélisande, Arkël, Golaud, Yniold. She appears to be related to the mythical figure Melusine in French folklore.

Premiere
Pelléas and Mélisande premiered on 17 May 1893 at the Bouffes-Parisiens under the direction of Aurélien Lugné-Poe. Lugné-Poe, possibly taking inspiration from The Nabis, an avant-garde group of Symbolist painters, used very little lighting on the stage. He also removed the footlights. He placed a gauze veil across the stage, giving the performance a dreamy and otherworldly effect. This was the antithesis to the realism popular in French theatre at the time.

Maeterlinck was so nervous on the night of the premiere that he did not attend. Critics derided the performance, but Maeterlinck's peers received it more positively. Octave Mirbeau, to whom Maeterlinck dedicated his play, was impressed with the work, which stimulated a new direction in stage design and theatre performance.

In music

The play has been the basis of several pieces of music. Perhaps the best known is the opera of the same name (1902) by Claude Debussy. In 1898, Gabriel Fauré had written incidental music for performances of the play in London and asked Charles Koechlin to orchestrate it, from which he later extracted a suite. In the same year Mel Bonis wrote a piano piece named 'Mélisande'. The story inspired Arnold Schoenberg's early symphonic poem Pelleas und Melisande of 1902–03. Jean Sibelius also wrote incidental music for it in 1905; the section "At the castle gate" has found fame as the signature music of the BBC The Sky at Night programme. In 2013, Alexandre Desplat, commissioned by the "Orchestre National des Pays de la Loire", composed a Sinfonia Concertante for Flute and Orchestra, inspired by Maeterlinck's Pelléas and Mélisande.

References

1893 plays
Plays by Maurice Maeterlinck